The Warren-Crowell House is a historic house in Terrell, Texas, U.S.. It was designed in the Prairie School style with a Colonial Revival porch by architect James E. Flanders, and completed in 1903. It has been listed on the National Register of Historic Places since May 23, 1980.

See also

National Register of Historic Places listings in Kaufman County, Texas
Recorded Texas Historic Landmarks in Kaufman County

References

Houses on the National Register of Historic Places in Texas
Colonial Revival architecture in Texas
Prairie School architecture
Houses completed in 1903
Buildings and structures in Kaufman County, Texas